Swonder Ice Arena is an arena and recreational sport facility in Evansville, Indiana. It features two NHL size sheets of ice for hockey, figure skating, and open skating. One sheet of ice is open all year. Sound and light, designed with the technology used at the 2002 Olympics, are in use when the skaters skate. Leagues for hockey from beginner to adult also take place year round. On the second level there is a 10,000-square-foot workout facility with a running/walking track.

History 
The current Swonder Ice Arena opened in October 2002 and replaced the older Swonder Ice Rink. Current seating capacity for spectators is 1,500 - approximately 1,000 in the primary (west) rink and approximately 500 in the secondary (east) rink.

Swonder was formerly the home of a professional minor league ice hockey team, the Evansville IceMen of the Central Hockey League, which moved to the new Ford Center in 2011 while continuing to practice at Swonder. Swonder was also home to the Rollergirls of Southern Indiana from 2007 to 2012 and local high school and youth hockey teams also compete throughout the winter.

In January 2012, the Evansville Rage of the Continental Indoor Football League moved to Swonder due to large ticket requests.

Swonder is also home to the local Indiana State High School Hockey League team, the Evansville Thunder.

In 2010, Swonder formed the first theatre on ice team in Indiana.  River City Ice Theatre competed at the 2012 U.S. Figure Skating Theater on Ice National Competition in Strongsville, OH where they received a second place award out of 37 teams for best original theme/story.  In 2012, River City Ice Theatre was adopted by the Greater Evansville Figure Skating Club and became a 501(c)3 organization.

From 2015 to 2019, the junior ice hockey team, the Evansville Jr. Thunderbolts of the North American 3 Hockey League, played home games at Swonder.

See also
Sports in Evansville

External links
Official Swonder Ice Arena website

Indoor arenas in Indiana
Indoor ice hockey venues in the United States
Sports venues in Evansville, Indiana
Ice hockey venues in Indiana